Mingdao may refer to:

Mingdao (1032–1033), era name used by Emperor Renzong of Song
Empress Mingdao (died 237), empress of Cao Wei
Yongjia Xuanjue (665–713), Chinese Buddhist monk, dharma name Mingdao
MingDao University, a university in Changhua County, Taiwan
Mingdao High School, a high school in Taichung, Taiwan

See also
Ming Dao (born 1980), Taiwanese actor
Minh Đạo (disambiguation)